William Kenneth Jones (born 26 June 1983) is an English football defender who plays for Bearsted.

His league debut came for Orient, in January 2001, when he was just 17. Over the next four seasons he played 79 games for the club, moving to Kidderminster Harriers in January 2005. Unfortunately, though, Kidderminster were relegated from the Football League, and Jones moved to Exeter at the end of the season.

Jones followed former teammate Danny Woodards to League One club Crewe Alexandra for £65,000 on a three-year deal. on 30 May 2007. Jones will become Crewe's second signing of the season from a non-league club.

On 11 June 2010, Jones agreed to re-sign for Exeter City after passing a medical. He was Exeter's first signing of the 2005 pre-season, re-uniting him with Alex Inglethorpe, whom he had worked with during his time in Leyton Orient's youth setup.

On 11 July 2012, Jones signed for Cheltenham Town on a two-year deal.

On 12 September 2013 Jones joined Newport County on a monthly contract as cover for the injured Andy Sandell. Jones made his debut for Newport County versus Morecambe on 14 September 2013 and scored within two minutes of kick-off. He was released by Newport in January 2014 and subsequently joined Gloucester City.

Jones signed for Harlow Town on 19 May 2016.

References

External links
Billy Jones player profile at crewealex.net
Billy Jones player profile at exetercityfc.co.uk

1983 births
Living people
Sportspeople from Chatham, Kent
Footballers from Kent
English footballers
Association football defenders
England semi-pro international footballers
Leyton Orient F.C. players
Kidderminster Harriers F.C. players
Exeter City F.C. players
Crewe Alexandra F.C. players
Cheltenham Town F.C. players
Newport County A.F.C. players
Gloucester City A.F.C. players
English Football League players
National League (English football) players